Tetsuya Murakami (born 24 September 1981), is a Japanese futsal player and futsal coach. He is part of the Japanese national futsal team.

Clubs 
 2005-2007 FIRE FOX
 2008- Shriker Osaka

Titles 
 All Japan Futsal Championship (3)
 2010, 2012, 2017

References

External links
FIFA profile

1981 births
Living people
Japanese men's futsal players
Japanese futsal coaches
Shriker Osaka players
People from Yamaguchi Prefecture